Darko Stojanov (born 11 February 1990) is a Macedonian footballer who plays as a defender.

Club career
In June 2016, Stojanov signed a contract with Bulgarian side Dunav Ruse, after a successful trial period with the club. He was released in October.

Notes

External links
 Profile at proplayersagency.com
 

1990 births
Living people
Footballers from Skopje
Association football central defenders
Macedonian footballers
North Macedonia under-21 international footballers
FK Vardar players
FK Madžari Solidarnost players
FK Belasica players
FK Bregalnica Štip players
FK Horizont Turnovo players
FC Dunav Ruse players
FK Borec players
FK Renova players
Macedonian First Football League players
First Professional Football League (Bulgaria) players
Macedonian Second Football League players
Macedonian expatriate footballers
Expatriate footballers in Bulgaria
Macedonian expatriate sportspeople in Bulgaria